Cofer may refer to:
 23788 Cofer, a main-belt asteroid, named after DCYSC awardee Evan Mitchell Cofer
 USS Cofer (DE-208), a U.S. Navy warship, named after John Joseph Cofer
 COFER: Currency Composition of Foreign Exchange Reserves
 Cofer, a taxonomic synonym of the plant genus Symplocos

People 
 Doyle Cofer (1923–1999), an American professional basketball player
 James Erwin Cofer (born 1949), a former president of Missouri State University and University of Louisiana
 Joseph Cofer Black (born 1950) a former CIA official
 Joe Cofer (born 1963), an American football player
 Judith Ortiz Cofer (1952–2016), a Puerto Rican American author
 Kermit R. Cofer (1908–1989), associate justice of the Supreme Court of Mississippi
 Lanell Cofer (1948–2018), American politician from Texas
 Phil Cofer (born 1996), American basketball player

See also
 Coffer (disambiguation)
 Mike Cofer (disambiguation)